The Gram Formation is a geological formation in Gram, Denmark. It preserves fossils dating from the  Miocene period. The formation consists of three layers: the glauconite-rich, the Gram Clay, and the Gram sand. The sediments in the formation were deposited in an open marine depositional environment known as the Gram Sea.

Fossil content 
Many fossils of new species have been discovered in the formation, including those of the beaked-whale Dagonodum mojnum and the mollusk species Pseudocochlespira gramensis, as well as specimens of better-known species such as Carcharodon megalodon.

See also 
 List of fossil sites
 Gram Natural History Museum

References 

Geologic formations of Denmark
Miocene Series of Europe
Tortonian
Shale formations
Shallow marine deposits
Paleontology in Denmark